Arthur Head (also known as Arthur's Head) in Fremantle, Western Australia, is a former large limestone headland on the southern side of the mouth of the Swan River, now also the entry to Fremantle Harbour.

Historian Bob Reece identifies the geographical prominence of the location in his entry in the Historical Encyclopedia of Western Australia:

Also the strategic quality of the head is noted as:

In May 1829 the strategic location of Arthur Head led it being chosen by Captain Charles Fremantle RN as the site for his fortified beach camp.

It has been significantly altered since European settlement in the 1830s, and is the site of a large number of demolished structures.

Archaeologist Michael Pearson in his 1984 report identified the following:
 1851 Lighthouse (first)
 1834 Courthouse (first)
 1840 Courthouse (second)
 1852 Police station complex
 Lighthouse keeper quarters
 Harbourmaster quarters

The structures remaining on the head are the Round House, the oldest remaining building in Western Australia, and the pilots' cottages, all of which are heritage listed. Passing through Arthur Head is the Whalers Tunnel that enabled ease of access to Bathers Beach, Fremantle and the Long Jetty.

A significant part of the Arthur Head area was utilised during World War II; the slipway constructed then for submarine repairs was known as the Arthurs Head Slipway.

Notes

Fremantle Harbour
Heritage places in Fremantle
State Register of Heritage Places in the City of Fremantle